Brandt James Bronico (born June 20, 1995) is an American professional soccer player who plays as a midfielder for Major League Soccer club Charlotte FC.

Career
After spending four years at University of North Carolina at Charlotte, Bronico was drafted as the 47th overall pick in the 2017 MLS SuperDraft by Chicago Fire.

In college, Bronico finished 2016 as First Team NSCAA All-Southeast Region, Player of the Year Conference USA, Offensive MVP Conference USA, First Team All Conference USA and Golden Boot Winner Conference USA.

He made his professional debut on March 11, 2017, as an 85th-minute substitute in a 2–0 win over Real Salt Lake.

On November 30, 2020, Chicago announced they had declined their contract option on Bronico. On December 18, 2020, Charlotte FC acquired the rights to Bronico ahead of their entry in to Major League Soccer beginning in 2022.

On March 17, 2021, Bronico joined USL Championship side Charlotte Independence on loan for their 2021 season.

Career statistics

References

External links 
 
 

1995 births
Living people
American soccer players
Charlotte 49ers men's soccer players
North Carolina Fusion U23 players
Seattle Sounders FC U-23 players
Chicago Fire FC players
FC Tulsa players
Charlotte Independence players
Charlotte FC players
Association football midfielders
Soccer players from North Carolina
Sportspeople from High Point, North Carolina
Chicago Fire FC draft picks
USL League Two players
Major League Soccer players
USL Championship players
Soccer players from Maryland